The Sinjar clashes of 2022 were a conflict that began on May 1, when the Iraqi military, with support from Turkey and the Kurdistan Democratic Party, launched an operation to push the YBS militia of the Popular Mobilization Forces out of Sinjar.

After YBS rejected an Iraqi army request to evacuate a checkpoint in the area, the clashes began, and the main part of the clashes continued for an hour and injured two civilians, and displaced over 3,000.

See also 

 Sinjar clashes (2017)
 Sinjar clashes (2019)

References  

Battles in 2022
Conflicts in 2022
2022 in international relations
Kurdish–Turkish conflict (2015–present)
History of the Kurdistan Workers' Party
Battles involving Iraq